The Western Australian Mulga shrublands is a deserts and xeric shrublands ecoregion of inland Western Australia. It is one of Australia's two mulga ecoregions, characterized by dry woodlands of mulga trees (Acacia aneura and related species) interspersed with areas of grassland and scrub.

Location and description
This is a hot, dry area with little rainfall.

The region consists of the Gascoyne and Murchison bioregions of the Interim Biogeographic Regionalisation for Australia (IBRA).

Flora and fauna
The predominant vegetation is mulga trees, a type of acacia adapted to the hot, dry climate by means of long tap roots. In some areas the mulga trees are surrounded by Eriachne grassland.

Wildlife of the region includes birds such as emus, Australian bustards and honeyeaters.

Most of the area is uninhabited but there is some mining activity and some sheep grazing, both of which cause damage to native habitats.

Protected areas
4.53% of the ecoregion is in protected areas. Protected areas in the ecoregion include:
 Barlee Range Nature Reserve
 Birriliburu Indigenous Protected Area
 Bullock Holes Timber Reserve
 Collier Range National Park
 De La Poer Range Nature Reserve
 Goongarrie National Park
 Matuwa and Kurrara-Kurrara Indigenous Protected Area
 Mount Augustus National Park
 Queen Victoria Spring Nature Reserve
 Toolonga Nature Reserve
 Unnamed WA46847 Nature Reserve
 Wanjarri Nature Reserve

External links

References

 
Deserts and xeric shrublands
Ecoregions of Western Australia